Lockerley is a village and civil parish in Hampshire, England on the border with Wiltshire. The parish has a population of around 827 people.

The Wessex Main Line railway crosses the parish, the nearest stations being at Dunbridge and West Dean.

Facilities
In Lockerley there is a village shop, a garage, and a school, Lockerley C of E Primary School. The parish church of St John the Evangelist was built in 1890. There is also a Baptist chapel.

History
Lockerley Camp is an Iron Age hillfort just to the East of Lockerley.

The site of a Saxon chapel lies within the churchyard of St John the Evangelist.

Lockerley Hall was used to house soldiers during the First World War. In the Second World War, Lockerley was the site of a huge storehouse for the US Army prior to the Invasion of Europe, established in October 1943 and largely obsolete by October 1944 by which time supplies were being sent direct to France. The depot was just outside Dunbridge station and comprised 15 miles of sidings and 134 covered sheds.

Notable residents
Frederick Luke, recipient of the Victoria Cross

References

External links

Villages in Hampshire